Dorsey is a primarily masculine given name which may refer to:

 Dorsey Armstrong (born 1970), professor of English and Medieval Literature
 Dorsey Burnette (1932–1979), American early rockabilly singer
 Dorsey Crowe (1891–1962), American politician
 Dorsey Dixon (1897–1968), American old-time and country music songwriter and musician
 Dorsey B. Hardeman (1902–1992), American politician, attorney and businessman
 Dorsey F. Henderson Jr., American Episcopal bishop
 Dorsey Levens (born 1970), American retired National Football League player
 Dorsey W. M. McConnell, American Anglican bishop
 Dorsey Ridley (born 1953), American politician
 Dorsey W. Shackleford (1853–1936), American politician
 Dorsey B. Thomas (1823–1897), American politician

English-language masculine given names